Armani Williams (born April 14, 2000) is an American professional stock car racing driver who last competed part-time in the NASCAR Camping World Truck Series, driving the No. 43 Toyota Tundra/Chevrolet Silverado for Reaume Brothers Racing and the No. 20 Chevrolet Silverado for Young's Motorsports. He has also competed in the ARCA Menards Series as well as what are now the ARCA Menards Series East and ARCA Menards Series West in the past.

Williams is the first NASCAR driver openly diagnosed on the autism spectrum. Over the course of his NASCAR career, Williams' cars have often sported blue paint schemes with the blue autism puzzle pieces to symbolize his diagnosis on the spectrum and to raise awareness. He is also one of five African-American drivers currently competing in NASCAR, along with Cup Series driver Bubba Wallace, Jesse Iwuji, Rajah Caruth, and Blake Lothian.

Racing career
Williams great-grandfather owned an auto-body repair shop creating the foundation for automobiles in the family.  Williams in particular loved to play with Hot Wheels toy cars as a child, and later discovered NASCAR on TV and immediately began watching races. He soon decided it was what he wanted to do as a career, so he began racing go-karts at age 8, and eventually bandoleros after that. Specifically, he attended a competitive go-karting school and then participated in go-kart races.

Williams originally competed in the ARCA Truck Series, which was shut down during his time racing in that series, so he moved to the NASCAR Pinty's Series in Canada in 2017. Driving for his mentor, D. J. Kennington, Williams drove his No. 28 Dodge in five races (plus withdrawing from a sixth), with a best finish of eleventh in his debut race at Delaware Speedway. He made one start in 2018 for Peter Simone's No. 97 Dodge at New Hampshire, where he earned his first top-10 finish in the series with a ninth-place.

He raced once in both the NASCAR K&N Pro Series East and West in 2018 for Calabrese Motorsports and Patriot Motorsports Group, respectively. He returned to the Patriot team, renamed Kart Idaho Racing, in 2019 (after a change in ownership), after not qualifying for the race at Irwindale driving the No. 35 for Vizion Motorsports. After Williams' DNQ, John Wood stepped out of his No. 38 for Williams to drive it, where he finished twelfth. In the East Series, Williams competed with Kart Idaho at New Hampshire, finishing eleventh in that race.

Williams in 2020 would make his debut in the ARCA Menards Series at Phoenix, where he drove Fast Track Racing's No. 01 car to a 17th-place finish. He would then run team's No. 12 car at Michigan, where he scored a top-ten finish.

In 2021, he made his NASCAR Camping World Truck Series debut at Gateway in the No. 33 Reaume Brothers Racing Toyota, finishing 21st.

In 2022, he will attempt two more races (originally 3 until Josh Reaume's Darlington throwback was released).

Personal life
Diagnosed at age two, Williams is on the autism spectrum and spoke his first word at three years old. He did have some social interaction and sensory issues growing up, as other people on the spectrum do, but quickly learned to improve and overcome them with the help of his parents.

He and his father attended the 2010 Brickyard 400 when he was ten which sparked his interest in racing along with playing with toy cars at home and watching NASCAR races on TV. He attends Oakland University studying mechanical engineering. His favorite driver growing up was Jimmie Johnson.

He is from Grosse Pointe, Michigan and had a 3.0 GPA at his high school while balancing school and racing.

Motorsports career results

NASCAR
(key) (Bold – Pole position awarded by qualifying time. Italics – Pole position earned by points standings or practice time. * – Most laps led.)

Camping World Truck Series

 Season still in progress
 Ineligible for series points

K&N Pro Series East

K&N Pro Series West

Pinty's Series

ARCA Menards Series
(key) (Bold – Pole position awarded by qualifying time. Italics – Pole position earned by points standings or practice time. * – Most laps led.)

 Season still in progress

References

External links
 
 

NASCAR drivers
ARCA Menards Series drivers
Living people
2000 births
Racing drivers from Detroit
People from Grosse Pointe, Michigan
People on the autism spectrum
African-American racing drivers
21st-century African-American sportspeople
20th-century African-American sportspeople